A transit mall is a street, or set of streets, in a city or town along which automobile traffic is prohibited or greatly restricted and only public transit vehicles, bicycles, and pedestrians, and emergency services are permitted.

Transit malls are instituted by communities who feel that it is desirable to have areas not dominated by the automobile, or as a way to speed travel time through an area—usually the city center—for transit vehicles and as a transport hub for interchanges, making them more efficient and thereby more attractive as an alternative to car use.  Converting a street or an area to a transit mall can be a form of pedestrianization, allowing pedestrians and cyclists as well as transit vehicles to move more freely, unimpeded by private motor traffic, if autos are banned completely.  However, some transit malls are not auto-free, but rather restrict cars and other private traffic to only short segments or only one lane, with other lanes being limited to buses or trams (streetcars).

Transit malls differ from busways, which are roadways dedicated to the movement of buses at high speed or capacity.

Europe
A number of European towns and cities have made part or all of areas their car-free while permitting public transit vehicles. These are often accompanied by car parks on the edge of the area and/or park-and-ride schemes. Most of these zones allow delivery trucks to service the businesses located there during the early morning, and street-cleaning vehicles will usually go through these streets after most shops have closed for the night.

Examples include:
 Gothenburg, Sweden
 Princes Street in Edinburgh, Scotland
 Queen Street in Oxford, England

North America
In North America, the creation of pedestrian-friendly urban environments is still in its infancy, but transit malls have existed in a few cities for more than 40 years, starting with the Nicollet Mall in Minneapolis, Minnesota in 1968, followed by the Granville Mall in Vancouver, British Columbia, in 1974 and the Portland Mall in 1977.  In North America, transit malls usually take the form of single streets in which automobiles are mostly prohibited but transit vehicles are allowed. They are rarely completely free of motor vehicles.  Often, all of the cross streets are open to motorized traffic, and in some cases taxis are allowed and truck deliveries are made by night.

Examples include:
 King Street Transit Priority Corridor in Toronto, Ontario
 Bryant-Pacific Transit Mall in Dallas, TX
 Nicollet Mall in Minneapolis, Minnesota
 Washington Avenue Mall in Minneapolis, Minnesota
 Granville Mall in Vancouver, British Columbia
 Portland Transit Mall in Portland, Oregon
 7th Avenue in Calgary, Alberta
 10th Street NW, Federal Triangle, Washington, DC, de facto
 16th Street Mall in Denver, Colorado
 Fulton Mall in Brooklyn, New York
 Graham Avenue Transit Mall in Winnipeg, Manitoba
 Long Beach Transit Mall in Los Angeles County
 Main Street Mall in Memphis, Tennessee
 Santa Rosa Transit Mall in Santa Rosa, California
 State Street in Madison, Wisconsin
 Transit Plaza in Champaign, Illinois
 Sundance Square Plaza (Main Street between 3rd & 4th Streets) in Fort Worth, Texas
 The former Chestnut Street Busway in Philadelphia.
 1st and 2nd Streets in San Jose, California
 Main Street in Buffalo, New York
 C Street in San Diego, California

Australia
Examples include:
 Adelaide Street bus mall in Brisbane, Australia
 Rosny Park Transit Mall in Rosny Park, Tasmania
 Hobart Bus Mall in Hobart, Australia
 George Street in Sydney, Australia
 Bourke Street Melbourne, Australia

Asia
Examples include:
 Jungang-daero Transit Mall, Daegu, South Korea (Daegu Station Junction - Banwoldang Junction)
 Sinchon Transit Mall in Seoul, South Korea
 Jaffa Road, Jerusalem in Israel.
 Discovery Bay, Lantau and Park Island, Ma Wan in New Territories, Hong Kong.

See also
 Car-free days
 List of car-free places
 
 Esplanade
 
 
 Mall

Further reading

References

 
Transportation planning
Public transport